The 2011 New Haven Open at Yale was a women's tennis tournament played on outdoor hard courts. It was the 43rd edition of the New Haven Open at Yale, and was part of the Premier Series of the 2011 WTA Tour. It was previously known as "Pilot Pen Tennis". It took place at the Cullman-Heyman Tennis Center in New Haven, Connecticut, United States, from August 22 through August 27, 2011. It was the last event on the 2011 US Open Series before the 2011 US Open.

WTA entrants

Seeds

 Seedings are based on the rankings of August 15, 2011.

Other entrants
The following players received wildcards into the singles main draw
  Marion Bartoli
  Jelena Janković
  Li Na
  Christina McHale

The following players received entry from the qualifying draw:

  Petra Cetkovská
  Vera Dushevina
  Ksenia Pervak
  Anastasia Rodionova

The following players received entry from a lucky loser spot:
  Carla Suárez Navarro

Finals

Singles

 Caroline Wozniacki defeated  Petra Cetkovská, 6–4, 6–1
It was Wozniacki's 6th title of the year and 18th of her career. It was her 4th consecutive win at the event, matching the feat Venus Williams had also done at New Haven. It was her 3rd premier-level title of the year and 7th of her career.

Doubles

 Chuang Chia-jung /  Olga Govortsova defeated  Sara Errani /  Roberta Vinci, 7–5, 6–2

2011 Earthquake
On August 23, 2011, 1:51 PM local time a 5.8 magnitude earthquake in Virginia stopped play for two hours while the main stadium was checked for damage by the fire department.

External links
Official website

References

 
2011 WTA Tour
2011 in sports in Connecticut
August 2011 sports events in the United States